Allegheny Township is a township in Cambria County, Pennsylvania, United States. It is part of the Johnstown, Pennsylvania Metropolitan Statistical Area. The population was 2,851 at the 2010 census, up from 2,498 at the 2000 census.

The township is the site of the Federal Correctional Institution, Loretto.

Geography
The township surrounds the separate borough of Loretto, and the borough of Chest Springs is along the township's northern border.

Communities

Unincorporated communities

Bradley Junction
Loretto Road
Wildwood Springs

2013 Frew Family shooting
On Friday, September 27, 2013, a shooting took place in Allegheny Township on Bottom Road around 10 PM. Four people were killed in what was initially reported to be a home invasion. Three people died on scene and a fourth person was taken to UPMC Altoona but died from complications at the hospital. The investigation is ongoing and details are still limited and unclear.

Pennsylvania State Police reports confirmed that the incident started as a home invasion that led to a domestic dispute. The home was on the 600 block of Bottom Road. John Frew Sr. was at home with his wife and adult son, just getting back from going out to dinner when there was a knock at the door. John's wife, Roberta Frew, answered the door to find her daughter, Josephine Ruckinger, and her son-in-law standing outside the door. She had enough time to yell "Oh my God, they have guns" before Josephine shot her in the chest, killing her instantly. John Frew Jr. attempted to retrieve a gun from a nearby location when he was shot by Josephine's husband, Jeff Ruckinger. John Sr. was able to grab a .22 caliber revolver from a rear bedroom. He then was forced to shoot and kill his daughter and son-in-law. Josephine was transported to UPMC Altoona where she was pronounced dead. John Sr. was injured and taken into police custody for questioning.

Josephine had not contacted her family in quite some time, after fleeing with her then boyfriend. John Sr. stated that he didn't recognize Josephine until after she was shot. The motive is unknown and autopsies are ongoing to determine if there were drugs involved or not.

Demographics

As of the census of 2000, there were 2,498 people, 533 households, and 420 families residing in the township.  The population density was 84.6 people per square mile (32.7/km).  There were 574 housing units at an average density of 19.4/sq mi (7.5/km).  The racial makeup of the township was 81.83% White, 16.01% African American, 0.28% Native American, 1.08% Asian, 0.04% from other races, and 0.76% from two or more races. Hispanic or Latino of any race were 10.33% of the population.

There were 533 households, out of which 37.1% had children under the age of 18 living with them, 67.9% were married couples living together, 7.3% had a female householder with no husband present, and 21.2% were non-families. 19.9% of all households were made up of individuals, and 6.4% had someone living alone who was 65 years of age or older.  The average household size was 2.92 and the average family size was 3.38.

In the township the population was spread out, with 16.8% under the age of 18, 8.8% from 18 to 24, 45.8% from 25 to 44, 21.7% from 45 to 64, and 6.9% who were 65 years of age or older.  The median age was 36 years. For every 100 females, there were 217.4 males.  For every 100 females age 18 and over, there were 264.6 males.

The median income for a household in the township was $41,310, and the median income for a family was $49,271. Males had a median income of $22,961 versus $22,232 for females. The per capita income for the township was $12,911.  About 7.1% of families and 10.7% of the population were below the poverty line, including 15.6% of those under age 18 and 14.5% of those age 65 or over.

References

Populated places established in 1788
Townships in Cambria County, Pennsylvania
Townships in Pennsylvania
1788 establishments in Pennsylvania